Giovanni Conti (17 November 1882 – 1 March 1957) was a deputy of the Kingdom of Italy and a senator in the Italian Republic.

He was born in Montegranaro, Marche. He became a member of the Italian Republican Party in 1912 and was elected into the Italian Parliament in 1921. He served in the Senate of Italy during Legislature I.

He died in Rome in 1957.

References

External links
  Italian Wikipedia article Giovanni Conti.

1882 births
1957 deaths
People from the Province of Fermo
Italian Republican Party politicians
Deputies of Legislature XXVI of the Kingdom of Italy
Deputies of Legislature XXVII of the Kingdom of Italy
Members of the Constituent Assembly of Italy
Senators of Legislature I of Italy
Politicians of Marche
Italian Aventinian secessionists